Yulia Sergeyevna Polyachikhina (born 6 February 2000) is a Russian model and beauty pageant titleholder who was crowned Miss Russia 2018. She represented Russia at the Miss Universe 2018 competition but did not place.

Early life
Polyachikhina was born in Cheboksary to Russian father Sergey Polyachikhin and Chuvash mother Olga Polyachikhina. She has one younger sister who is eleven years younger than her. Polyachikhina studies journalism at the Chuvash State University. She has worked as a professional model in Paris and Osaka.

Pageantry
Polyachikhina began her pageantry career after placing as the first runner-up in Miss Chuvashia 2015. She returned to the competition the following year and was crowned Miss Chuvashia 2016. Afterwards, she represented Russia in Miss Globe 2016 and placed in the top ten. Polyachikhina later represented Chuvashia at the Miss Russia 2018 competition in Moscow. She went on to win the competition, succeeding Polina Popova of Sverdlovsk Oblast. Her runners-up were Violetta Tyurkina of Belgorod and Natalya Stroeva of Yakutia. As part of her winning prize, Polyachikhina was awarded a brand new car and ₽3 million. As Miss Russia, she represented Russia as a favorite expected to place in the top ten of Miss Universe 2018 competition, where she failed to place. 

Polyachikhina crowned Alina Sanko of Azov as her successor at the Miss Russia 2019 competition on 13 April 2019.

She is now married to Roustam Tariko and has 2 kids: Son Leo (2020) and Daughter Rosa (2021).

References

External links
 

2000 births
Chuvash people
Chuvash State University alumni
Living people
Miss Russia winners
Miss Universe 2018 contestants
People from Cheboksary
Russian beauty pageant winners
Russian female models